Verderio Inferiore was  a comune (municipality) in the Province of Lecco in the Italian region Lombardy. In 2014 it was merged with Verderio Superiore, forming the new comune of Verderio.

Cities and towns in Lombardy